Ángel Eduardo García Gutiérrez (born March 2, 1976) is a Mexican football manager and former player.

References

1976 births
Living people
Tigres UANL footballers
C.F. Cobras de Querétaro players
C.F. Monterrey players
Correcaminos UAT footballers
Albinegros de Orizaba footballers
Liga MX players
Ascenso MX players
Mexican football managers
Association football defenders
Footballers from Nuevo León
Sportspeople from Monterrey
Mexican footballers